Traction is an interactive advertising agency based in San Francisco. In 2014, they were named Independent Agency of the Year in the iMedia Agency Awards. Their clients include Alibaba.com, Adobe Systems, Bank of America, Cabot Creamery, California Bank & Trust, Camelbak, Intuit, Intel, Kelly-Moore Paints, Livescribe, Meebo, Robert Half International, Salesforce.com, SAP, and Shutterfly, Walmart, ZoneAlarm.

History
The agency was founded in 2001 as Traction Corporation by Adam Kleinberg, Paul Giese, Theo Fanning and Michele Turner. The founding partners had previously worked together at Think New Ideas, a new media pioneer with heavy investments from Omnicom. Michele Turner left the company in 2009.

In 2006, Traction Corporation started a creative staffing agency called SubTraction. In 2009, Traction acquired 8 Speed Multimedia, a provider of dynamic media.

The agency broadened its services to include Media in 2013.

Awards and recognition

2008 

 Selected by Adobe Systems to be featured in an original documentary series “Designing Minds” showcasing creative leaders of the design industry with a view into the creative forces behind the shows, ads, and products people use every day.

2009 

 Awarded BtoB Magazine "Interactive Agency of the Year"
 Inc. 5000 - Ranked #1,399 
 #51 on the list of "Fastest Growing Companies in the Bay Area". 
 Named "Social Media Agency To Watch" by iMediaConnection

2010 

 Awarded BtoB Magazine “Top Interactive Agency of the Year - Runner-up” 
 Inc. 5000 - Ranked #1217

2011 

 Awarded BtoB Magazine "Top Interactive Agency of the Year - Runner-up" 
 iMediaConnection named Traction blog among “5 agency blogs you should be reading”

2012 

 Focus.com "5 Agencies Built for Technology Marketing"  
 The Next Web "10 small agencies that define 'Digital Spring' in San Francisco"

2013 

 Awarded BtoB Magazine "Top Interactive Agency" 
 Awarded "AdAge Small Agency of the Year: West Region/Silver"
 San Francisco Business Times "Fastest Growing Companies in the Bay Area" 
 Agency Post's 2013 Agency 100 
 iMedia Small Agency of the Year - Finalist 
 Digiday Best Brand Campaign, B2B - Winner 
 Digiday Best Video Campaign, B2B - Winner

2015 
 iMedia Small Agency of the Year - Finalist

2016 
 iMedia Small Agency of the Year - Finalist 
 BMA Small Agency of the Year - Finalist

2017 

 launched Live Suite for delivering a live video stream across many sites.

Notable campaigns

 “Real or Fake?” Adobe Systems - One of Adobe’s most successful social media campaigns was developed by Traction geared toward driving engagement to their new CS products. This campaign has been featured in a number of articles including being featured as a case study by Facebook.
 “Never miss a word.” Livescribe - Traction introduced the Livescribe Smartpen to the college market.
 “Find it. Make it. Sell it.” Alibaba.com - Traction launched a $30 million campaign for China’s largest online retailer Alibaba.com to the U.S.

References

External links
 Traction official website

Advertising agencies of the United States
Marketing companies established in 2001
Companies based in San Francisco